Daniel Paul Booko  (born October 17, 1983) is an American actor and model. He has had roles in The O.C, Hannah Montana, and The Suite Life of Zack & Cody, and in the film Bratz: The Movie.  His father is Pastor Paul Booko of Riverside Church in Three Rivers, Michigan. His mother starred in many commercials in Chicago throughout the 1970s and 1980s.

Booko played football and was involved with the music department at North Park University.

Filmography

References

External links

MySpace

1983 births
Living people
Male models from Michigan
American male film actors
American male television actors
Male actors from Michigan
People from Three Rivers, Michigan
Place of birth missing (living people)